The 2019–20 Magyar Kupa, known as  for sponsorship reasons, was the 62nd edition of the tournament.

Schedule
The rounds of the 2019–20 competition are scheduled as follows:

Matches 
A total of 51 matches were take place, starting with Pre-qualifying on 27 August 2019 and culminating with the Final on 17 May 2020.

Pre-qualifying
The pre-qualifying round ties was scheduled for 27–29 August 2019.

|-
!colspan="3" style="background:#ccccff;"| 27 August

|-
!colspan="3" style="background:#ccccff;"| 28 August

|-
!colspan="3" style="background:#ccccff;"| 29 August

|}

First round
The first round ties was scheduled for 2–17 September 2019.

|-
!colspan="3" style="background:#ccccff;"| 2 September

|-
!colspan="3" style="background:#ccccff;"| 3 September

|-
!colspan="3" style="background:#ccccff;"| 5 September

|-
!colspan="3" style="background:#ccccff;"| 6 September

|-
!colspan="3" style="background:#ccccff;"| 7 September

|-
!colspan="3" style="background:#ccccff;"| 8 September

|-
!colspan="3" style="background:#ccccff;"| 10 September

|-
!colspan="3" style="background:#ccccff;"| 17 September

|}

Second round
The second round ties was scheduled for 2–16 October 2019.

|-
!colspan="3" style="background:#ccccff;"| 2 October

|-
!colspan="3" style="background:#ccccff;"| 9 October

|-
!colspan="3" style="background:#ccccff;"| 10 October

|-
!colspan="3" style="background:#ccccff;"| 15 October

|-
!colspan="3" style="background:#ccccff;"| 16 October

|}

Third round
The third round ties was scheduled for 5–13 November 2019.

|-
!colspan="3" style="background:#ccccff;"| 5 November

|-
!colspan="3" style="background:#ccccff;"| 11 November

|-
!colspan="3" style="background:#ccccff;"| 12 November

|-
!colspan="3" style="background:#ccccff;"| 13 November

|}

Fourth round
The fourth round ties was scheduled for 10–11 December 2019.

|-
!colspan="3" style="background:#ccccff;"| 10 December

|-
!colspan="3" style="background:#ccccff;"| 11 December

|}

Fifth round
The fifth round ties was scheduled for 3 February – 11 March 2020.

|-
!colspan="3" style="background:#ccccff;"| 3 February

|-
!colspan="3" style="background:#ccccff;"| 14 February

|-
!colspan="3" style="background:#ccccff;"| 13 March

|}

See also
 2019–20 Nemzeti Bajnokság I
 2019–20 Nemzeti Bajnokság I/B
 2019–20 Nemzeti Bajnokság II

References

External links
 Hungarian Handball Federaration 
 hetmeteres.hu

Magyar Kupa Men